Jogyesan, or Mount Jogye, is a mountain of South Jeolla Province in southwestern South Korea. It is the main attraction of Mount Jogye Provincial Park.

It takes its name from the Jogye Order, which founded a key monastery, Songgwangsa, on this mountain. The order, in turn, is named after the southern Chinese hamlet of Cáoxī ("Cáo Creek", pronounced Jogye in Korean), where the historically influential Nanhua Temple stands.

Beside the Songgwangsa, Jogyesan is also home to Seonamsa, an important monastery of the Taego Order, a splinter group of the Jogye.

See also
List of mountains of Korea

References

Mountains of South Korea
Mountains of South Jeolla Province